Oldenlandia umbellata (called chay root or choy root, from its Tamil name, chaaya ver) is  a low-growing plant native to India. A colour-fast red dye can be extracted from the root bark of (preferably) a two-year-old plant. Chay root dye was once used with a mordant to impart a red colour to fabrics such as calico, wool, and silk.

It is grown on the Coromandel Coast in India.

Medicinal use
This plant is well known in Siddha Medicine for its styptic property. It is also a drug that can be administered for bronchial asthma, as a decoction of the entire plant, a decoction made from its root and liquorice in the ratio-10:4, or the powdered root is given either with water or honey.

A decoction of the root also is a febrifuge.

References

Plant dyes
umbellata
Plants described in 1753
Taxa named by Carl Linnaeus